Bohdan Paszkowski (born 31 January 1965 in Białystok) is a Polish politician and jurist. In 2007 and since 2015 he is the Voivode of Podlaskie Voivodeship.

Biography
He was born in Białystok, the son of Andrezej. In 1989 he graduated from the Faculty of Law of the Branch of the University of Warsaw in Białystok (now the University of Białystok). In the years 1990–1992 he was a judge in the Provincial Court in Białystok. In 1993, he obtained the qualifications of a legal advisor. From December 20, 1994, to December 12, 2006, he was the city secretary of Białystok. He served as a senator in the VII, VIII and IX convocations of the Polish Senate. On December 8, 2015, he was appointed to the post of Voivode of Podlaskie Voivodeship by Prime Minister Beata Szydło. He is married and has two daughters.

External links

References

Law and Justice politicians
Politicians from Białystok
1965 births
Living people
University of Białystok alumni

pl:Bohdan Józef Paszkowski